The president of the Senate (Spanish: Presidente de la Cámara de Senadores) is the presiding officer of the Mexican Senate.  The incumbent president is Senator Olga Sánchez Cordero.

The Senate of Mexico, at the beginning of each annual legislative session, elects an executive board (Mesa Directiva) from among its 128 members. The executive board comprises a president, three vice-presidents, and four secretaries, elected by an absolute majority of the senators. The president, and other members of the executive board may be re-elected for the following year without restriction. The president of the executive board also serves as the President of the Senate.

Although the President of the Senate is the presiding officer of the upper house of the Mexican Congress, the President of the Chamber of Deputies is the President of Congress as a whole.

Presidents of the Senate 1824-1857

Presidents of the Senate since 1874

List of presidents of the Gran Comisión 1877-2000

References

Presidents of the Senate of the Republic (Mexico)
Mexico
Congress of the Union
President